The Roman Catholic Diocese of San Carlos de Bariloche is based in the city of San Carlos de Bariloche, usually referred to as Bariloche,  in the province of Río Negro, Argentina. The diocese is a suffragan of the province of Bahia Blanca. The city is located in the foothills of the Andes.

Ordinaries
  (1993–2000), appointed Bishop of Avellaneda
 Fernando Carlos Maletti (2001–2013), appointed Bishop of Merlo-Moreno
  (2013–2022), appointed Bishop of Merlo-Moreno

References
http://www.catholic-hierarchy.org/diocese/dscdb.html

Bariloche
San Carlos de Bariloche
San Carlos de Bariloche
San Carlos de Bariloche
San Carlos de Bariloche